Balanced Commercial Property Trust, formerly BMO Commercial Property Trust, is a large British investment trust dedicated to investments in commercial properties. Established in 2005, the company, which was formerly known as F&C Commercial Property Trust, is listed on the London Stock Exchange and is a constituent of the FTSE 250 Index. The chairman is Martin Moore.

History
The company was established as F&C Commercial Property Trust in Guernsey in 2005. Having launched near the top of the market, following the market downturn in 2007–2008, a merger with UK Commercial Property Trust, a fellow FTSE 250 property company was proposed in 2010. This was narrowly rejected by 50.07% of shareholders. It restructured as a real estate investment trust in April 2019 and rebranded as BMO Commercial Property Trust in June 2019. It changed its name from BMO Commercial Property Trust to Balanced Commercial Property Trust in June 2022.

References

Real estate companies established in 2005
Financial services companies established in 2005
Investment trusts of the United Kingdom
Companies listed on the London Stock Exchange